Kanagaraj Balakrishnan (born 18 January 1988) is a professional ATP Tennis Player from Malaysia.

He has played for Malaysia and also represented Malaysia in the 2007 SEA Games in Thailand.

Kanagaraj Balakrishnan is currently coached by Mon S Sudesh of Prospin Tennis Management. He played in the ATP 250 Event in Malaysia vs. Rohan Bopanna of India.
His tennis career began at the Nike Bhupathi Tennis Academy in Bangalore, India.

External links 
 
 http://www.tennisexplorer.com/player/balakrishnan/
 http://www.ontennis.com/kanagaraj-balakrishnan
 https://classic.tennisrecruiting.net/player/overview.asp?id=617574
 http://www.gettyimages.ca/detail/news-photo/malaysian-tennis-player-kanagaraj-balakrishnan-hits-a-serve-news-photo/78296653
 http://www.ltam.org.my/coming-events/nstp-national-championships-2011-leg-4-16-20-july-2011direct-acceptance
 http://www.tribuneindia.com/2005/20051205/sports.htm#8
 http://www.nationmultimedia.com/2007/12/08/sport/sport_30058561.php

Living people
1988 births
Malaysian male tennis players
Place of birth missing (living people)
Malaysian people of Indian descent
21st-century Malaysian people